Drochia district, also known as Drokievsky district, is a district in the north of Moldova. Its administrative center is the city of Drochia. As of 2011, its population was 90,100.

History
The oldest historical attestations about the settlements in the district from the period 1443 to 1470 when the mentioned villages Cotova, Hasnasenii Mari, Mindic. In the next century of growth followed both economic, cultural and demographic explosion, shown by the fact that 11 villages in the district had 3,000 inhabitants. After the Treaty of Bucharest in 1812, Bessarabia as Drochia district are occupied by the Russian Empire at this time there is a massive colonization by Ukrainians and Russians. In 1918 after the collapse of the Russian Empire, Bessarabia united with the motherland Romania. And in 1940, Bessarabia is again occupied by the USSR on the Molotov-Ribbentrop Treaty. After the 2004 census the population was 94.500 inhabitants of the district.

Geography
Drochia district is located in the north of Moldova, has Donduseni District neighborhood in north, east Florești and Soroca district, south Singerei District and Riscani District in the southwest. In the northern district they learn remains of Plateau Moldova, while most of the district is located in Balti Steppe. The relief is poorly fractured, weak erogenous processes. Chernozems occupy about 80% of the district.

Climate 
District climate is temperate, with shades continental. Average annual temperature is c. 9–10.5, average temperature in July is 21 C, while in January −5 C. Annual precipitation varies from 600 to 650 mm years reaching rainy, while 300–350 mm in dry years. Average wind speed is 3–6 m \ s.

Fauna 
Fauna is characterized by the presence of such mammals such as fox, ferret, wild boar, deer, fallow deer, rabbit, weasel, and hedgehog; and in water bodies: muskrat and otter. For birds, there are: stork, crow, partridge, swallow, egret and swan. In the past the Balti steppe was populated by bustards. Now they have disappeared or are in a tiny number. The emblem of Drochia District is a bustard, from which comes the name of the district.

Flora 
Forests occupy 8.1% of the district's area and are characterized by: hornbeam, oak, beech, lime, chestnut, ash and others. Plants, mainly steppe features are: fescue, clover, wormwood, burdock, knotweed and others.

Rivers 
Drochia district is located in the Raut river basin (the largest tributary of the Nistru River), which has a length of 286 km, crossing tributaries of the district are along Raut, Cubolta (101 km) and Cainari (86 km). Most lakes in the district have artificial origin.

Administrative subdivisions
There are a total of 40 localities: 1 city, and 27 communes (containing further 12 villages within):

Cities

Communes

Demographics
1 January 2012 the district population was 89,500 of which 22.8% urban and 77.2% rural population.

Births (2010): 904 (10.0 per 1000)
Deaths (2010): 1311 (14.5 per 1000)
Growth Rate (2010): -407 (−4.5 per 1000)

Ethnic groups 

Footnote: * There is an ongoing controversy regarding the ethnic identification of Moldovans and Romanians.

Religion 
Christian – 98.2%
Orthodox Christian – 97.0%
Protestant – 1.2%
Baptists – 0.5%
Pentecostals – 0.3%
Seventh-day Adventists – 0.2%
Evangelicals – 0.2%
Other – 1.4%
No Religion – 0.4%

Economy
As of 2009, 13,767 businesses were registered in the district. 11,168 these were private farms, 1,585 individual businesses, 492 limited liability companies, 28 joint stock companies, 13 state-owned enterprises, 257 "public ventures", and 224 other types.

Education
At of 2009, there were 41 kindergartens in the district, with 3,827 kids. There were 12 lyceums (grades 1–12), 9 secondary schools (grades 1–11), 15 gymnasiums (grades 1–9),
3 primary schools (grades 1–4), a boarding school for students with disabilities, and an auxiliary school.

Politics
Located in the so-called North Red electoral region (the region where PCRM obtained favorable results over 50% of votes), district in 2001–2009 was mainly communist district. But after the 2010 elections the communists lose to the AEI.

During the last three elections AEI had an increase of 68.0%

Elections 

|-
!style="background-color:#E9E9E9" align=center colspan="2" valign=center|Parties and coalitions
!style="background-color:#E9E9E9" align=right|Votes
!style="background-color:#E9E9E9" align=right|%
!style="background-color:#E9E9E9" align=right|+/−
|-
| 
|align=left|Party of Communists of the Republic of Moldova
|align="right"|18,003
|align="right"|44.57
|align="right"|−5.12
|-
| 
|align=left|Liberal Democratic Party of Moldova
|align="right"|11,400
|align="right"|28.22
|align="right"|+12.0
|-
| 
|align=left|Democratic Party of Moldova
|align="right"|5,583
|align="right"|13,82
|align="right"|-2.46
|-
| 
|align=left|Liberal Party
|align="right"|1,700
|align="right"|4.21
|align="right"|−4.36
|-
| 
|align=left|Party Alliance Our Moldova
|align="right"|940
|align="right"|2.33
|align="right"|−2.80
|-
|bgcolor="grey"|
|align=left|Humanist Party of Moldova
|align="right"|489
|align="right"|1.21
|align="right"|+1.21
|-
|bgcolor="grey"|
|align=left|Other Party
|align="right"|2295
|align="right"|5.64
|align="right"|+1.53
|-
|align=left style="background-color:#E9E9E9" colspan="2"|Total (turnout 59.01%)
|width="30" align="right" style="background-color:#E9E9E9"|40,697
|width="30" align="right" style="background-color:#E9E9E9"|100.00
|width="30" align="right" style="background-color:#E9E9E9"|

Culture
There are 33 public libraries and 5 museums in Drochia district. There are also 115 art groups.

Personalities
 Ion Buga – Politician, member of the Moldovan Parliament 1990–1994, former president of the party New Historical Option
 Ion Costaș – Minister of Internal Affairs of Moldova in 1990–1992
 Nicolae Filip – Specialist in physics, geometry ultrashort radio wave propagation, and honorary member of the Academy of Sciences of Moldova.
 Nicolae Testemițanu – Scientist, surgeon, hygienist and politician

References

External links
 District Council Webpage
 Drochia District at the Webpage of the Ministry of Local Public Administration

 
Districts of Moldova